Gilia sinuata is a species of flowering plant in the phlox family known by the common names rosy gilia and rosy phlox. It is native to western North America from British Columbia to New Mexico, where it can be found in a number of open habitats, generally in sandy soil, and at elevations from 500 to 7500 feet.

Description 
This wildflower produces a basal rosette of toothed leaves from which grow one or more erect, multibranched stems. The stems are glandular and are pale green with pinkish or purplish tinting and have a few scattered toothed leaves, especially near branching junctions.

The inflorescence holds a cluster of rounded flowers, each on a short pedicel. Each flower has a long, tubular throat which is pink or lavender, often striped in white. It opens into a flat-faced or somewhat bell-shaped corolla with five lavender or pinkish lobes. Normal bloom time is from March to June depending on latitude/elevation.

Its fruit is a capsule which has three divisions and holds two to eight seeds in two rows.

External links
Jepson Manual Treatment - Gilia sinuata
Gilia sinuata - Photo gallery

Flora of Nevada
Flora of Oregon
Flora of Arizona
Flora of the California desert regions
Flora of the Great Basin
Flora of the Sonoran Deserts
Flora without expected TNC conservation status